Chiganaki is a rural locality (a khutor) in Krasnoyarskoye Rural Settlement, Kotelnikovsky District, Volgograd Oblast, Russia. The population was 324 as of 2010. There are 7 streets.

Geography 
Chiganaki is located on the east bank of the Tsimlyansk Reservoir, 47 km north of Kotelnikovo (the district's administrative centre) by road. Krasnoyarsky is the nearest rural locality.

References 

Rural localities in Kotelnikovsky District